Sangkae District is a district (srok)  within Battambang Province, in north-western Cambodia.

Administration
The district is subdivided into 10 communes (khum).

Communes and villages

References

 
Districts of Battambang province